Hooppole is a village in Henry County, Illinois, United States. The population was 204 at the 2010 census, up from 162 in 2000. As of 2018, the population has grown to an estimated 236.

Geography
Hooppole is located at  (41.522127, -89.913862).

According to the 2010 census, Hooppole has a total area of 0.88 square kilometers (0.34 mi2), all land.

Demographics

At the 2000 census there were 162 people, 61 households, and 45 families living in the village. The racial makeup of the village was 96.91% White, 0.62% African American, 2.47% from other races. Hispanic or Latino of any race were 7.41%.

Of the 61 households, 29.5% had children under the age of 18 living with them, 67.2% were married couples living together, 6.6% had a female householder with no husband present, and 26.2% were non-families. 21.3% of households were one person and 11.5% were one person aged 65 or older. The average household size was 2.66 and the average family size was 3.02.

The age distribution was 27.2% under the age of 18, 4.3% from 18 to 24, 26.5% from 25 to 44, 30.2% from 45 to 64, and 11.7% 65 or older. The median age was 38 years. For every 100 females, there were 118.9 males. For every 100 females age 18 and over, there were 103.4 males.

The median household income was $32,188 and the median family income was $37,083. Males had a median income of $27,321 versus $21,667 for females. The per capita income for the village was $16,638. About 4.3% of families and 4.3% of the population were below the poverty line, including 7.1% of those under the age of 18 and none of those 65 or over.

Religion 
There are two churches located in the village. The Calvary Evangelical Church and the Zion United Methodist Church are both located on Main St. The Shrine of St. Mary of the Fields is located in a rural area two miles northwest of Hooppole. It is one of several of the Shrines to the Rosary and to the Blessed Virgin Mary for the Roman Catholic Diocese of Peoria.

References

Villages in Henry County, Illinois
Villages in Illinois